Moses Tay Leng Kong (born 1938) is a retired Singaporean Anglican bishop. He was the 7th Bishop of Singapore from 1982 to 2000and the first Archbishop of the Province of Anglican Church in South East Asia from 1996 to 2000.

Tay was educated in medicine at the University of Singapore. He practiced medicine in Malaysia for eight years.

He was Dean of the Diocese of Singapore (1974-1982). In 1982, Tay was installed as the 7th Bishop of Singapore. On 2 February 1996, he was installed as archbishop of Province of South East Asia.

In early 1982, he was posted as director of the Tan Tock Seng Hospital, following the career path that the Ministry of Health had charted, but a few months later tendered his resignation to be appointed as the Bishop of Singapore.

Philip Jenkins notes that when Tay visited Stanley Park in Vancouver in the early 1990s, he was deeply troubled by the totem poles he saw there. He concluded that "as artifacts of an alien religion, these were idols possessed by evil spirits, and they required handling by prayer and exorcism." Jenkins goes on to suggest that this behavior "horrified the local Anglican church," which "regarded exorcism as an absurd superstition."

Tay was involved in founding the Anglican Mission in the Americas in the late 1990s to give support to orthodox Anglicans in North America. He was involved in the consecration of Chuck Murphy and John H. Rogers Jr. as their bishops in 2000.

In 2000, Tay stepped down as Bishop of Singapore and handed over his office to John Chew.

Tay was one of the most outspoken voices in the Anglican Communion in opposition to the theological liberalism of the Episcopal Church of the United States.

Bibliography

Sources
biographical sketch on Tay

References

1938 births
University of Singapore alumni
Anglican bishops of Singapore
Singaporean Anglicans
Singaporean people of Chinese descent
Singaporean archbishops
Anglican archbishops of South East Asia
Living people
Anglican archbishops in Asia
20th-century Anglican bishops in Asia
20th-century Anglican archbishops
Anglican realignment people